Maestro is a 2014 French comedy-drama film directed by Léa Fazer. The idea of the film came from co-writer Jocelyn Quivrin's experience of working with director Éric Rohmer in 2006 on Rohmer's last film Romance of Astree and Celadon. It stars Pio Marmaï,  Michael Lonsdale, Déborah François and Alice Belaïdi.

Cast 

 Pio Marmaï as Henri Renaud
 Michael Lonsdale as Cédric Rovère
 Déborah François as Gloria
 Alice Belaïdi as Pauline Vatel
 Nicolas Bridet as Nico
 Dominique Reymond as Francine
 Micha Lescot as José
 Scali Delpeyrat as The Druid
 Grégory Montel as Sam
 Marie-Armelle Deguy as Marie-Jeanne

Accolades

References

External links 
 

2014 films
2014 comedy-drama films
2010s French-language films
French comedy-drama films
Films about filmmaking
Films about actors
Films about film directors and producers
Films directed by Léa Fazer
Éric Rohmer
2010s French films